Józef Mroszczak (May 11, 1910 in Nowy Targ, Poland - September 19, 1975, in Warsaw, Poland) was a Polish graphic designer and representative of the Polish School of Posters.

Education
After graduating from high school in his hometown in 1928, he started his studies at Cracow’s School of Decorative Arts and Art Industry (1930–'33), and then at the Kunstgewerbeschule and the Graphische Lehr- und Versuchtanstalt in Vienna’s Academy of Graphic Arts (1934–'37).

Career
When he completed his higher education he settled in Katowice, there he taught at the city's Trade High School from 1936 to 1937. Mroszczak was one of the founders of Katowice's Free School of Painting and Drawing, where he ran a graphic arts studio in the years 1937-'39, at the same time conducting courses at the Institute of Commercial Education in Chorzów. From 1938, he lectured on the theory of advertising at the College of Administration and Social Studies in Katowice. During the German occupation he taught courses on drawing and lettering at the Trade High School in Zakopane and at the Nowy Targ School of Economics. Just after the end of World War II, Mroszczak organized much of the artistic life throughout Silesia, later on he co-founded and assumed the chairmanship of the regional office of the Polish Artists’ Association (ZPAP). From 1947 to 1953, he lectured at the Katowice School of Art, which was later transformed into the Second Faculty of Graphic Art at Cracow's Academy of Fine Arts. In addition, his skills were employed in designing the Polish coal industry stands at various international fairs.
	
Mroszczak moved to Warsaw in 1952 and obtained the post of creative director at the publishing house Wydawnictwo Artystyczno-Graficzne (1952–1956) and a lectureship at the city's Academy of Fine Arts. He was Chair of Graphic Design from 1957 to 1960, and Dean of the School of Graphic Arts from 1968 to 1971. He became an associate professor in 1956 and a full professor in 1971.
	
Mroszczak also lectured at numerous foreign universities, such as the Akademie für Bildende Kunst in Berlin-Weissensee (1958) and Hochschule der Künste in West Berlin (1964). In 1963 he lectured at Vienna's Akademie für Angewandte Kunst, and in 1964 he was invited to give a series of lectures at the Folkwangeschule in Essen, a presentation at the Fachbereich Architektur Technische Universität Darmstadt, and he conducted a seminar at the Hochschule für Gestaltung in Ulm. In 1965 he lectured at the Linz Kunstschule, and in 1966 he participated in a conference for visual communication organized at the German Universität zu Köln. He was invited to conduct a course for graphic designers at the Centre for Creative Enterprise near Moscow in 1968. He lectured at the German Westfälische Wilhelms-Universität Münster and at the Association of Russian Artists in Moscow, and lectured on teaching graphic design in Vienna and Linz in 1974.
	
Mroszczak co-founded the periodical Projekt (Design) and was its editor from 1956 until 1966. He was Vice Chairman of ZPAP's Chief Artistic Committee, and was co-founder and Chairman of the Warsaw International Poster Biennial Organizational Committee from 1966 to his death in 1975. He was a member of the Committee for Packaging, the Council for Culture and Artistic Higher Education at the Art and Culture Ministry, and the Fine Arts Council. He served as Chairman of the Artistic Committee of the Wilanów Poster Museum, and was both Presidium Member of the Prime Minister's Council on Industrial Aesthetics and Design, and Chairman of the Fine Arts Section of the State Awards Committee.
	
His interests included poster design, the art of exhibition, and functional graphic design. He designed pavilions at various international expositions and fairs, including Poznań, Paris, Milan, Barcelona, Leipzig, Stockholm, Helsinki, Izmir, Bari, Brussels, and Vienna. He was Chief Designer of the Polish Industry Exhibition in Moscow in 1959; and in 1961 he co-designed the Polish pavilion at the international work safety exposition “Italia ‘61” in Turin.
	
Mroszczak became a member of AGI in 1950 and served as Chairman of the organization's Polish Section from 1966 to 1974. In 1968–70, he was Vice Chairman of ICOGRADA. He was also an honorary member of the Dutch Graphic Artists Association (GVN) and of the Academia Nazionale de Belli Arte in Parma.

Mroszczak died on September 19, 1975, in Warsaw.

Distinctions
 1947 – Golden Cross of Democratic Hungary
 1952 – Golden Cross of Merit
 1959 – Officer's Cross of the Order of Polonia Restituta
 1975 – Commander's Cross of the Order of Polonia Restituta

Individual expositions

 1962 - Katowice 
 1964 - Vienna, Galerie in der Biberstrasse
 1968 - London
 1971 - Essen, Deutsches Plakat Museum
 1972 - West Berlin, Galerie Warschau 
 1972 - Moscow 
 1973 - Leningrad 
 1973 - Warsaw, Dom Artysty Plastyka
 1976 - Warsaw, Galeria Zapiecek (posthumous)
 1978 - Essen, Deutsches Plakat Museum
 1985 - Warsaw, Kordegarda (tenth anniversary of the artist's death)
 1990 - Warsaw, Galeria TPSP "Stara Kordegarda" (80th anniversary of the artist's birth)
 1993 - Nowy Targ, Galeria "Jatki"
 1996 - Warsaw, ASP

Prizes and awards
 1950 – Katowice City Award, 
 1950 – 3rd Prize for graphic art at the "Plastyka w obronie Pokoju" (“Art in Defense of Peace”) salon
 1951 – 2nd Prize at the "Plastyka w obronie Pokoju" salon for the poster "Peace"
 1952 – 2nd Prize at the "Kongres Narodów w Obronie Pokoju" (“Congress of Nations in Defense of Peace”) competition
 1953 – 2nd Prize (joint) at the 1st Polish National Poster Exposition, Warsaw (To my homeland I pledge, 22 July 1953, Peace – Happiness for Our Children)
 1953 – State Award of the 3rd order, 
 1955 – 2nd Prize (joint) at the 2nd Polish National Poster and Illustration Exposition, Warsaw (National Front, Christopher Columbus, Flowers of the People's Republic)
 1956 – CUK Prize for achievements in film posters at the Film Poster Exhibition, Warsaw
 1961 – 2nd Prize, Poster Exhibition "Polskie Dzieło Plastyczne w XV-lecie
PRL” (“Polish Artistic Endeavour after 15 years of the People’s Republic of Poland”), Warsaw
 1961 – Monthly award (June) in "Best Varsovian Poster" competition (Exhibition of Greek Photography)
 1962 – Monthly award (February) in "Best Varsovian Poster" competition (Cepelia - kilim) 
 1964 – Monthly award (January) and the annual award in "Best Varsovian Poster" competition (Don Carlos)
 1964 – First Order Award from the Ministry of Culture and Art Award 
 1965 – Gold medal (collective), International Exhibition of Book Art (IBA), Leipzig
 1966 - Monthly award (January) and the annual award in "Best Varsovian Poster" competition (Polish Culture Congress)
 1966 – Monthly award (December) in "Best Varsovian Poster" competition (The Gipsy Baron)
 1966 – Prize at the 2nd International Functional Graphics Biennial, Brno
 1966 – Prize sponsored by the Minister of Defense at the 1st International Poster Biennial, Warsaw,
(Auschwitz never again project)
 1967 - Monthly award (September) and the annual award in "Best Varsovian Poster" competition (The Icon in Poland and its Transformations)
 1968 – State Award of the 2nd order
 1968 – Monthly award (June) in "Best Varsovian Poster" competition (Wilanów Poster Museum)
 1968 – Association of Swiss Graphic Artists’ (VSG) Prize "Prisma", Zurich, for popularizing the poster around the world
 1969 – Prize sponsored by the ZPAP Regional Office in Katowice at the 3rd Polish National Poster Biennial, Katowice (Wilanów Poster Museum)
 1970 – Monthly award (June) in "Best Varsovian Poster" competition (3rd International Poster Biennial)
 1970 – Ministry of Culture and Art Award for achievements in organization of the didactic process
 1970 – Award from the Council of Industrial Aesthetics and Design 
 1971 – Monthly award (June) in "Best Varsovian Poster" competition (Word and Image)
 1971 – “Problems for Peace and Socialism” Editors’ First Prize, International Political Poster Competition, Prague 
 1972 – Monthly award (December) in "Best Varsovian Poster" competition (Soviet Poster)
 1972 – Jury prize at the 4th International Poster Biennial, Warsaw (for a three poster set)
 1972 – Prize sponsored by "Życie Warszawy" at the 4th International Poster Biennial, Warsaw (Works by Judges of the 4th IPB)
 1972 – 1st Prize at the 4th Polish National Review of Museum and Conservation Posters, Przemyśl (Word and Image)
 1974 – Foreign Ministry's Certificate of Recognition for outstanding service in the promotion of Polish culture abroad
 1974 – Prize in the "Problems for Peace and Socialism" magazine competition, Moscow
(Work, Happiness, Peace, Freedom, Progress)
 1974 – Gold Medal at the 6th Biennial of Functional Graphics, Brno (Word and Image)
 1974 – One of two joint first prizes in the "Turystyka w wycieczce łączonej krajów demokracji ludowej" (“Tourism in the joint tour of people’s democratic republics”) competition
 1975 – UNESCO Prize in the "Habitat" poster competition, Paris

Texts and publications by Józef Mroszczak
 O liternictwie, Głos Plastyków 1937, 1–7, p. 126
 Wiedeńska wystawa plakatów, Odrodzenie 1948/45
 O dalszy wzrost poziomu ideowo-artystycznego plakatu polskiego. In: O plakacie. Zbiór materiałów (..), WAG, Warsaw 1953
 O dalszy wzrost poziomu ideowo-artystystycznego plakatu polskiego, Przegląd Artystyczny 1953/3
 [preface in:] Vystava polsky plakat [cat.], Prague 1954
 Tadeusz Trepkowski, Życie Warszawy 1955/5
 [preface in:] An Exhibition of Polish Posters [cat.], Washington 1955
 [preface in:] (International Caricature Exhibition) [cat.], Vienna 1955
 [preface in:] Polnische Plakate [cat.], Norymberga 1956
 [preface in:] Polnisches Plakat, Ausstellung [cat.], West Berlin 1957
 [preface in:] Cartazes poloneses, [cat.] Rio de Janeiro 1959
 [preface in:] Polish Poster, Exhibition (...) [cat.], Ottawa 1960
 [preface in:] L'Exposition d'affiches polonaises [cat.], Beirut 1961
 Polnische Plakatkunst, Econ Verlag, Wien - Düsseldorf 1962
 [preface in:] I Międzynarodowe Biennale Plakatu [cat.], Warsaw 1966
 I Międzynarodowe Biennale Plakatu, WAG, Warsaw 1968
 [preface in:] II Międzynarodowe Biennale Plakatu [cat.], Warsaw 1968
 Uwagi o sztuce, Kultura 1978/41

References

External links
 Jozef Mroszczak's posters

Polish graphic designers
Polish poster artists
1910 births
1975 deaths
Recipients of the State Award Badge (Poland)